The 2009 ICC World Cup Qualifier was a cricket tournament that took place in April 2009 in South Africa. It was the final part of the Cricket World Cup qualification process for the 2011 Cricket World Cup.

The tournament is the renamed version of the ICC Trophy, and was the final event of the 2007–09 ICC World Cricket League.

Teams

The following teams, who attained One Day International status from the previous World Cup, and who made up Division One of the World Cricket League qualified automatically. Kenya did not play in the last 2 qualifying tournaments as they were the first associate team to gain ODI status and thus qualified for the last 2 World Cups automatically but are no longer guaranteed ODI status and will once again need to compete in the qualifying tournament.

Promoted through 2007 ICC World Cricket League Division Two:

Promoted through 2009 ICC World Cricket League Division Three:

The top four teams (previously 6) from this tournament qualified for the 2011 Cricket World Cup, while the top six teams gained One Day International or maintained One Day International status for the following four years and also automatically qualify for the ICC Intercontinental Cup. The bottom two teams were relegated to 2011 ICC World Cricket League Division Three. The final and the play-offs for third and fifth place were official ODIs.

Ireland won the tournament after beating Netherlands. Ireland, Netherlands, Canada and Kenya all qualified for the 2011 ICC World Cup. Despite not qualifying for the World Cup Afghanistan and Scotland secured ODI status and competed for 5th spot, with Afghanistan winning the playoff.

As a result of the tournament, Afghanistan gained ODI status for the first time. Afghanistan had begun the ICC World Cricket League 2007-09 in the bottom division, but won the Division Five, Division Four and Division Three tournaments to qualify for this event, and ultimately win ODI status. Afghanistan replaced Bermuda as the sixth Associate Nation with ODI status.

Status of games
All matches played in this tournament have List A cricket status. Additionally, some matches have One Day International status; these matches are:
 Matches in the group stage played between teams who entered the tournament with ODI status
 Matches in the playoff stage played between teams who finished the tournament with ODI status
None of the Super Eight matches were considered ODIs, even if played between teams who started or finished with ODI status.

Significantly, this meant that Afghanistan's Group Stage matches were not considered ODIs, but its 5th place playoff match against Scotland was considered an ODI.

Players

Group stage

Group A

Group B

Super Eights

Playoffs

9th and 11th Place Playoffs

11th place playoff

9th place playoff

7th place playoff

5th place playoff

3rd place playoff

Final

Final standings

Statistics

See also

ICC World Cricket League
2011 Cricket World Cup

References

External links
Official Site (Archived 2009-06-24)
World Cricket League structure

Qualifier
World Cup Qualifier
World Cup Qualifier
Qualifier, 2009
2009
World Cup Qualifier
World Cup Qualifier